

Belarus Today is a state run publisher in Belarus; it controls numerous media entities such as their current namesake publication Belarus Today.

It was named  Sovetskaya Belorussiya – Belarus' Segodnya previously.

See also
 Mass media in Belarus
 Propaganda in Belarus

Notes

References

Further reading
 Szostek, J. (2015). Russian influence on news media in Belarus. Communist and Post-Communist Studies, 48(2/3), 123–135.

External links
 Official site

1927 establishments in the Soviet Union
Publications established in 1927
Propaganda in Belarus
Newspapers published in the Soviet Union
Russian-language newspapers published in Belarus
Presidential Administration of Belarus
Mass media in Minsk